Aguerre is a surname. Notable people with the surname include:

Gustavo Aguerre (born 1953), Argentine photographer, writer, and theatre designer
Mariano Aguerre (born 1969), Argentine polo player
Washington Aguerre (born 1993), Uruguayan footballer

See also
Paso Aguerre, village and municipality in Neuquén Province, Argentina